Huss or HUSS may refer to:

Companies
HUSS Park Attractions, a German amusement ride manufacturer

Places
Huss Township, Minnesota, United States

People with the surname
a Swedish noble family, which is divided into two main groups
Andreas Huss (born 1950), Swiss chess master
Henry Holden Huss (1862–1953), American composer, pianist and music teacher
Hugo Jan Huss (1934–2006), Romanian-born orchestra conductor and music director
Jan Hus (14th century–1415), Czech Catholic priest, philosopher, reformer, and master at Charles University in Prague
Pierre J. Huss (1903–1966), American journalist and author
Toby Huss (born 1966), American actor
Adam Huss (born 1977), American television and film actor, producer, casting director, singer and writer
Boaz Huss (born 1959), professor of Kabbalah
Daniel Huss (born 1979), Luxembourgian footballer
Darrin Huss (born 1965), vocalist and lyricist of the Canadian dark synthpop band Psyche
Ephrat Huss (currently active), Senior Lecturer at Ben-Gurion University, Israel
Evi Huss, German slalom canoer who competed from the early 1990s to the early 2000s
Judson Huss (1942–2008), American-born painter and sculptor
Søren Huss (born 1975), Danish singer, songwriter and musician
Stephen Huss (musician) (born 1967), founder of the duo Psyche
Stephen Huss (tennis) (born 1975), Australian professional tennis player
Andrew Hussie (born 1979), The creator of mspaintadventures

People with the forename
Huss Garbiya actor in Sex Lives of the Potato Men and Some Voices films

Other
Various fish species including Galeorhinus, Mustelus, Scyliorhinus, Galeus melastomus, Squalus acanthias - also known as Spiny dogfish or "Rock salmon" in the UK fish and chip trade
A "Huss Number" is relevant to meteorite identification
Hemolytic-uremic syndrome (HUS), a urinary tract disease
Pleasure or joy on the Teletext videogame page Digitiser
A trademark term yelled by wrestlers "The Bezerker" John Nord and Bruiser Brody